(stands for SOFtware Engineering Laboratory) is a Japanese information technology company involved with business application systems development, multimedia service and system development, and the development of RFID services and systems. It was established in May 1979 to provide software such as COMPS to their major clients.

The company was briefly involved with video games in the late 1980s and early 1990s. It produced games for the Nintendo Entertainment System, Super Nintendo Entertainment System, and Game Boy. Its best-known games include Casino Kid and Wall Street Kid.

External links
 Official SOFEL Website (Japan)
 List of SOFEL games at GameFAQs

Video game companies of Japan
Software companies based in Tokyo
Engineering companies based in Tokyo
Software companies established in 1979
Radio-frequency identification
Japanese companies established in 1979
Japanese brands